Garrett is a player character and the protagonist of the stealth games series Thief. The character was introduced in Thief: The Dark Project in 1998. Multiple publications praised his character as one of top antiheroes in video games and even as one of gaming's best characters overall.

Appearances

As a child, Garrett was recruited into the Keepers but later left the organization, went into business for himself as a thief, and now uses his Keeper skills to steal from the rich. Using his skills to steal and kill on his way to get the big part of his mission 

In Thief: Deadly Shadows a large scar runs down one side of his face, the result of Viktoria plucking out one of his eyes in Thief: The Dark Project. During the second and third games Garrett sees with a prosthesis mechanical eye, a piece of Mechanist technology given to him by the Hammerites at the end of The Dark Project. The mechanical eye incorporates a zoom lens. At the end of Thief: Deadly Shadows, Garrett catches hold of a small child trying to pick his pocket, and their conversation is almost identical to that between his mentor Artemus and child Garrett.

A completely new character with same name appears in the new Thief which was released in 2014. This Garrett is described as being a new version of the original.

Reception
The character was very well received by critics. In 1999, GameSpot included him on the list of top ten heroes in gaming, stating how "over the course of his adventures, Garrett emerges from under the misanthropic facade as a character with a noble heart, whose immoral ways are reluctantly justified by an immoral talent that's well suited to his immoral world". GameSpot also chose him as one of the 64 contenders in the 2009 user poll "All Time Greatest Video Game Hero". In 2010, games™ listed him among the greatest ever game characters, commenting that "few main characters are as cynical and mysterious as Garrett" and adding that "it's Garrett's unique skills and upbringing that make him such a fascinating character". In 2011, Empire ranked him as the 29th greatest video-game character, calling him to "a medieval Han Solo type" and adding that it is "his sardonic amorality that shines through most of all, ensuring Garrett a place as one of gaming's most appealing anti-heroes". In 2008, PC Zone ranked him as PC gaming's ninth best character for his "wonderful" situational sarcasm, calling him a "medieval Sam Fisher of sorts" and contrasting him with Marcus Fenix (who was ranked as ninth worst). That same year, Garrett got an honorable mention on the list of the best Xbox Heroes by 360 Magazine along with a comment that Garrett "was highly unfortunate not to make the final 50" in the user poll. 

In 2012, IGN featured him among gaming's most notorious anti-heroes, calling him "a true badass and anti-hero, combining a ruthless exterior with an unshakeable sense of honor". GameSpy's Mike Sharkey called Garrett a noticeable omission from the 2011 Guinness World Records Gamer's Editions top 50 video-game characters. Also in 2012, GamesRadar ranked this "not exactly Robin Hood" as 35th "most memorable, influential, and badass" protagonist in games, also calling him "a pioneer of sorts, paving the way for the myriad other thieves and assassins of our time". In a 2021 list published by PC Gamer staff, Garrett is ranked among the most iconic characters in PC gaming.

References

Action-adventure game characters
Adoptee characters in video games
Fictional archers
Fictional criminals in video games
Fictional characters with disfigurements
Fictional professional thieves
Fictional swordfighters in video games
Fictional traceurs and freerunners
Male characters in video games
Orphan characters in video games
Science fantasy video game characters
Thief (series)
Video game characters introduced in 1998